The 1960 Akron Zips football team represented Akron University in the 1960 NCAA College Division football season as a member of the Ohio Athletic Conference. Led by seventh-year head coach Joe McMullen, the Zips played their home games at the Rubber Bowl in Akron, Ohio. They finished the season with a record of 1–8 overall and 1–6 in OAC play. They were outscored by their opponents 70–269.

Schedule

References

Akron
Akron Zips football seasons
Akron Zips football